Dvorovi (Cyrillic: Дворови) is a town located just north of the city of Bijeljina in Republika Srpska, Bosnia and Herzegovina. It suffered major damage during the flooding in May 2014.

Tourism
Banja Dvorovi is a popular tourist destination.

Sport
Dvorovi has a football club known as FK Proleter Dvorovi.

References

External links
 Bijeljina official website (Serbian)  
 FK Proleter Dvorovi (Serbian)

Bijeljina
Populated places in Bijeljina
Spa towns in Bosnia and Herzegovina